Welcome to Canada is a Canadian docufiction film directed by John N. Smith and released in 1989. Loosely based on a real-life incident, the film depicts the interactions of a small community in Newfoundland with a group of Sri Lankan Tamil refugees who turn up in the town. The film's cast includes Charlene Bruff, Madonna Hawkins, Nirmalan Masilamany, Anandprasad Pathanjali, Beverly Power, Francis Power, Rosie Power, Kumar Singam Nadarajah, Murugesu Sivanesan and Sinnakili Baskaran.

The film premiered at the Montreal World Film Festival in 1989, and was screened at the 1989 Toronto International Film Festival.

Smith received a Genie Award nomination for Best Director at the 11th Genie Awards in 1990.

References

External links

1989 films
Canadian docufiction films
English-language Canadian films
Films directed by John N. Smith
Tamil-Canadian culture
1980s Canadian films